André Hansen (born 17 December 1989) is a Norwegian professional footballer who plays as a goalkeeper for Rosenborg in Eliteserien. He made his International debut for Norway in 2013.

Club career
He hails from Veitvet, and started his career with Bjerkealliansen. He went from there to Skeid Fotball. In 2007, he was loaned out to Kjelsås Fotball. He was signed by Lillestrøm in 2008, but spent the 2008 season on loan back at Skeid. He made his debut in the Norwegian top division against SK Brann in April 2009, conceding three goals. He conceded another three goals in his second game. In late July 2009 he was loaned out to KR Reykjavík. Hansen was named as Goalkeeper Of The Year in Iceland, and selected for the All-Star Team, despite only playing eight matches. He returned to Lillestrøm SK before the 2010 season.

As Stefan Logi Magnusson was Henning Berg's preferred goalkeeper at Lillestrøm, Hansen primarily played for the reserve team in the Third Division. His contract with the club expired at the end of the 2010 season - and on 8 July 2010 he signed a four-year contract with Odd Grenland, joining the club on 1 January 2011. Hansen stated that he changed club because he had a greater chance to play regularly in the Tippeligaen with Odd. Hansen became Odd's first-choice goalkeeper in his first season with the club, and played all 30 matches.

In the Tippeligaen match against Strømsgodset on 23 May 2012, Hansen was injured as a result of a collision with Péter Kovács sustaining a fracture of the cheek bone which kept him out of action for three weeks.

International career
Hansen has represented Norway from Under-18 to Under-23 level, and was capped 7 times for the Norwegian under-21 team,.

In August 2012 Hansen was called up for the senior team for the first time. The next month Hansen was again called up for the senior national team, and goalkeeping coach Frode Grodås stated that Hansen was mainly to be used by the national team as the third-choice goalkeeper behind Rune Jarstein and Espen Bugge Pettersen. Hansen made his debut for the national team on 12 January 2013, when Norway drew 0–0 in a friendly match against Zambia.

Career statistics

Club

International

Honours
Rosenborg
Tippeligaen/Eliteserien: 2015, 2016, 2017, 2018
Norwegian Cup: 2015, 2016, 2018
Mesterfinalen: 2017, 2018

Individual
Eliteserien Player of the Year: 2018

References

External links 
 

1989 births
Living people
Footballers from Oslo
Norwegian footballers
Norwegian jurists
Association football goalkeepers
Norway international footballers
Skeid Fotball players
Kjelsås Fotball players
Lillestrøm SK players
Knattspyrnufélag Reykjavíkur players
Odds BK players
Rosenborg BK players
Eliteserien players
Norwegian expatriate footballers
Expatriate footballers in Iceland
Norwegian expatriate sportspeople in Iceland